Skjerve is a village and statistical area (grunnkrets) in Nøtterøy municipality, Norway.

The statistical area Skjerve, which also can include the peripheral parts of the village as well as the surrounding countryside, has a population of 152.

The village Skjerve is located between Kjøpmannskjær in the south and Borgheim in the north. It is considered a part of the urban settlement Årøysund, which covers the southern part of the island. The urban settlement Årøysund has a population of 2,069.

References

Villages in Vestfold og Telemark